KWCM-TV (channel 10) is a PBS member television station in Appleton, Minnesota, United States, owned by the West Central Minnesota Educational TV Corp. KWCM-TV's studios are located on Pioneer Drive in Granite Falls, and its transmitter is located near Appleton.

KSMN (channel 20) in Worthington operates as a full-time satellite of KWCM-TV; this station's transmitter is located near Chandler, Minnesota. KSMN covers areas of southwestern Minnesota that receive a marginal to non-existent over-the-air signal from KWCM, although there is significant overlap between the two stations' contours otherwise. KSMN is a straight simulcast of KWCM; on-air references to KSMN are limited to Federal Communications Commission (FCC)-mandated hourly station identifications during programming. Aside from the transmitter, KSMN does not maintain any physical presence locally in Worthington.

The two stations are collectively branded as Pioneer PBS. Their combined signal can also be received in parts of Iowa, South Dakota and North Dakota. Several other translators carry the signal into other communities.

History

KWCM went on the air for the first time on February 7, 1966. In the early years, it repeated the signal of KTCA-TV in the Twin Cities. It adopted the Pioneer Public Television name in 1982, and added KSMN in 1997.

The station is available on the DirecTV and Dish Network feeds for the Twin Cities and Sioux Falls markets. Appleton is part of the Twin Cities market, while Worthington is in the Sioux Falls market. This gives Pioneer a potential audience of 4.8 million people in Minnesota, Iowa, South Dakota, North Dakota and Wisconsin. As of November 3, 2019, the station became Pioneer PBS due to PBS' overhaul.

Pioneer-produced shows
Some locally produced shows include Postcards, Prairie Sportsman, Funtime Polka, Your Legislators, Country Spires and programs produced with the University of Minnesota Morris, Prairie Yard and Garden, Academic Challenge, Echoes of Cry of the Marsh and Minnesota Rivers and Fields.  Some of these shows have also been shown on the Minnesota Channel, a statewide network originated at KTCI-TV in the Twin Cities which carries local programs on Saturday and Sunday evenings.

Technical information

Subchannels
The stations' digital signals are multiplexed:

Analog-to-digital conversion
KWCM-TV and KSMN shut down their analog transmitters on June 12, 2009. KWCM-TV's digital signal relocated to VHF channel 10 from UHF channel 31, while KSMN's digital signal remained on its pre-transition UHF channel 15.

Translators
A network of digital translators in western Minnesota translates KWCM.

References

External links

Pioneer Public Television
Rabbitears.info Query - KWCM
Rabbitears.info Query - KSMN

PBS member stations
Television stations in Minnesota
Television channels and stations established in 1966
1966 establishments in Minnesota